"Drunker Than Me" is the title of the debut song co-written and recorded by American country music artist Trent Tomlinson. It was released in October 2005 as the first single from his debut album Country Is My Rock. Tomlinson wrote the song with Ashe Underwood.

Music video
The music video was directed by Trey Fanjoy and premiered in November 2005.

Chart performance
The song debuted at number 56 on the U.S. Billboard Hot Country Songs chart for the week of October 22, 2005.

References

2005 songs
2005 debut singles
Trent Tomlinson songs
Songs written by Trent Tomlinson
Music videos directed by Trey Fanjoy
Lyric Street Records singles